Helsinki Ice Hall is an indoor arena located in Helsinki, Finland. The arena has a seating capacity of 8,200.

History

Helsinki Ice Hall has been the home arena of HIFK of Liiga since its construction in 1966. The arena was also the home of Jokerit from 1967 until the team moved to the new Hartwall Arena in 1997.

Helsinki Ice Hall used to be the main venue for the majority of important ice sports events and indoor arena concerts held in Finland, but after the constructions of Gatorade Center in 1990, Hartwall Arena in 1997, and Tampere Deck Arena in 2021, many of the largest events now take place in the newer arenas. Nevertheless, the arena still remains an active venue for concerts, conferences, expos and sports events. During the 2016 World Junior Ice Hockey Championships, games were played there.

While the Hartwall Arena was the planned secondary venue for the 2022 IIHF World Championship, the games of group A were moved to Helsinki Ice Hall, due to some of the owners of the Hartwall Arena being covered by the sanctions set up after the 2022 Russian invasion of Ukraine.

Helsinki Ice Hall is sometimes called "Nordis", referring to its address on Nordenskiöldinkatu. Another nickname for the arena is "Petoluola", Finnish for "The Beast Cave", which refers to the 2nd logo of HIFK: a red panther.

Events

 Tina Turner (1985, 1990)
 Frank Zappa (1988)
 9A super group (2006)
 Heaven and Hell (2007, 2009)
 Avril Lavigne (2005, 2008)
 Van Halen (1998)
 Mötley Crüe (1989, 2007)
 Avenged Sevenfold (2010)
 Judas Priest (1986, 1991, 2008, 2012, 2015, 2022)
 Megadeth (2008, 2011)
 Metallica (1988, 1992, 1996)
 Scorpions (1989, 1991, 2004)
 Deep Purple (1993, 2009)
 Dream Theater (2005, 2007, 2009, 2012, 2014)
 Opeth (2009, 2011)
 Pain of Salvation (2011)
 Frank Sinatra (1989)
 Whitesnake (2011, 2022)
 Sex Pistols (2008)
 Snoop Dogg (2008)
 The Prodigy (2009)
 Kelly Clarkson (2008)
 Yes (2004)
 Paramore (2009)
 50 Cent (2010)
 Bullet for My Valentine (2010)
 Taste of Chaos 2009 (Performers: Maylene and the Sons of Disaster, Every Time I Die, Killswitch Engage and In Flames)
 Disturbed (2008)
 Tokio Hotel (2010)
 Thirty Seconds to Mars (2008)
 ZZ Top
 Muse (2007)
 Motörhead (1981, 1999, 2007, 2008, 2009)
 KISS (1983, 1988, 2022)
 Dire Straits (1985)
 The Who (1967)
 Rammstein (2001)
 Stevie Wonder (1984)
 The Beach Boys (2006)
 Slayer (2006, 2018)
 The Knockouts and Brian Setzer on the Brian Setzer Rockabilly Riot tour (2011)
 Guns N' Roses (1991)
 Erasure (1992)
 Finale of Idols (2007, 2008)
 Finale of X Factor (2010)
 Jeff Dunham (2009)
 WWE (WrestleMania Revenge Tour/Raw in 2009 and SmackDown in 2019)
 Mr. Olympia (1992)
 Santana
 Tori Amos (2011)
 AC/DC (1986, 1988, 1991, 1996)
 Iron Maiden (1983, 1984, 1986, 1988, 1990, 1992, 1993, 1998, 1999)
 Bon Jovi (1986, 1988, 1989, 1993)
 Sunrise Avenue (2015, 2016)
 Twenty One Pilots (2016, 2019)
 Bring Me the Horizon (2016)
 The 1975 (2017)
 Slipknot (2004, 2008, 2015)
 Marilyn Manson (2001, 2007, 2017)
 Halsey (2020)

See also
List of indoor arenas in Finland
List of indoor arenas in Nordic countries

References

External links

1966 establishments in Finland
HIFK
Indoor arenas in Finland
Indoor ice hockey venues in Finland
Sports venues completed in 1966
Sports venues in Helsinki